Lake Ann may refer to one of several locations in the United States:

Lakes
Lake Ann (Arkansas)
Lake Ann (Michigan)
Lake Ann (Minnesota)
Lake Ann (Texas)
Lake Ann (Washington)

Towns and other settlements
Lake Ann, Michigan

See also
Lake Anne, Fairfax County, Virginia